Rosina Storchio (19 January 1872 – 24 July 1945) was an Italian lyric coloratura soprano who starred in the world premieres of operas by Puccini, Leoncavallo, Mascagni and Giordano.

Biography

Born in Venice in 1872, Storchio studied at the Milan Conservatory before making her operatic debut as Micaëla in Bizet's Carmen at Milan's Teatro Dal Verme in 1892. Three years later, she debuted at Italy's most famous opera house, La Scala, Milan, performing in Massenet's Werther. She sang Violetta at La Scala in 1906, the first performance of the opera in contemporary dress.

Milan became her home base from then on, but she also appeared during the pre-World War I period at theatres in other key Italian cities, including Rome and her native Venice. She toured South America and Spain, too, and undertook singing engagements in Paris and Moscow, unwisely attempting parts as heavy as that of the title role in Puccini's Tosca. In 1921, by which time her voice was in marked decline, she sang in Chicago and New York City. Her final public performance was as Cio-Cio San in Puccini's Madama Butterfly in Barcelona in 1923. (She had sung this same part in the first performance of Butterfly, at La Scala, in 1904.)

Storchio died in Milan near the end of World War II. She left a small legacy of 78-rpm gramophone recordings made during the early years of the 20th century. These recordings (reissued since on CD) include extracts from verismo opera—the repertoire with which she was most closely associated. She did, however, also appear on stage in a few French operas and works by Verdi, most notably Falstaff.

Operatic roles created by Storchio
1897: Mimì in La bohème (Leoncavallo)
1900: Zazà in Zazà (Leoncavallo)
1903: Stephana in Siberia (Giordano)
1904: Cio-Cio San in Madama Butterfly (Puccini)
1917: Lodoletta in Lodoletta (Mascagni)

External links

Rosina Storchio, Forgotten Opera Singers (Ashot Arakelyan)
 from Donizetti's Don Pasquale
"Gazoldo degli Ippoliti – Inaugurazione del museo lirico Rosina Storicho", by G. Baratti, mincioedintorni.com, 3 February 2016 

1872 births
1945 deaths
Musicians from Venice
Italian operatic sopranos
Fonotipia Records artists
Milan Conservatory alumni
20th-century Italian women